The Best German Novels of the Twentieth Century is a list of books compiled in 1999 by Literaturhaus München and Bertelsmann, in which 99 prominent German authors, literary critics, and scholars of German ranked the most significant German-language novels of the twentieth century. The group brought together 33 experts from each of the three categories. Each was allowed to name three books as having been the most important of the century. Cited by the group were five titles each by Franz Kafka and Arno Schmidt, four by Robert Walser, and three each by Thomas Mann, Hermann Broch, Anna Seghers and Joseph Roth.

Top 10

See also

NRC's Best Dutch novels

References

External links
Der Kanon – article on the novels of the German literary canon 

Lists of novels
Top book lists